Alemannia Karlsruhe was a German association football club from the city of Karlsruhe, Baden-Württemberg. The club was formed as Karlsruher Fußball-Club Alemannia 1897 Karlsruhe in 1897 and played four seasons in the regional top-flight Südkreisliga as a lower table side from 1908 to 1912.

In July 1912 Alemannia merged with Phönix Karlsruhe to form Karlsruher Phönix-Alemannia. During World War II the club played as part of the combined wartime side Kriegspielgemeinschaft Phönix/Germania Karlsruhe alongside Germania Durlach in 1943–45.

Following the war these clubs went their separate ways with Alemannia going on to merge with VfB Mühlburg on 16 October 1952 to create Karlsruher Sport-Club.

References

Football clubs in Germany
Defunct football clubs in Germany
Defunct football clubs in Baden-Württemberg
Association football clubs established in 1897
1897 establishments in Germany
1912 disestablishments in Germany
Association football clubs disestablished in 1912